The Queensland Civil and Administrative Tribunal (QCAT) is statutory organisation responsible for reviewing administrative law decisions of some Queensland Government departments and agencies, and also adjudicating some civil law disputes. The tribunal was established under the Queensland Civil and Administrative Tribunal Act (2009).

Civil disputes in which the amount in dispute is more than $750,000 are heard by the Supreme Court of Queensland, while those in which the amount is $150,000 or less are heard by either the Magistrates Court or the QCAT.

See also

List of Queensland courts and tribunals

References

2009 establishments in Australia
Australian administrative law
Queensland law
Australian tribunals
Courts and tribunals established in 2009